Island School (Chinese: 港島中學) is a co-educational international school located in Hong Kong. Established in 1967, it is a founding member of the English Schools Foundation. The school has been accredited by international organisations such as the Council of International Schools and the Western Association of Schools and Colleges. The school currently houses over 1,200 students across 33 nationalities.

The school has relocated itself twice since its establishment. Using the site of a former British military hospital from 1967 to 1972, the school permanently settled in 20 Borrett Road, Mid-Levels from 1972 to 2017. However, due to redevelopment work, the school temporarily moved to two campuses in Sha Tin District from December 2017. The school has since returned to 20 Borrett Road as of August 2022 after 4 years of redevelopment work. 

Island School is a registered IB World School and offers the IB diploma program along with an alternative BTEC program in the senior years. Island School also offers the IGCSE (International General Certificate of Secondary Education) in Years 10-11.

History 
Island School was founded in 1967 as the first secondary school of the English Schools Foundation. 

It is an international school, enrolling students from a large number of countries.

It was located in a former British military hospital from 1967-72, until it permanently settled in 20 Borrett Road, Mid-Levels from 1972-2017. 

Stephen Loggie is the current principal of Island School. He had previously been a Foundation Principal at two schools, one of which being the Queensland Academy of Science Maths and Technology. 

The previous principal was Christopher Binge, who had been secondary principal at the La Châtaigneraie campus of the International School of Geneva. Binge left to become the head of Markham College.

Campus

Island School's former campus consisted of seven blocks ranging from five to seven floors high, with blocks 1 to 6 arranged in a rectangular fashion. Students could travel to adjacent blocks by linked walkways or footbridges. As the campus was situated on mountainous terrain, blocks located close to the mountain were placed at a higher altitude than their counterparts, and as such the floors between different blocks were often not correlated. In 2018, the former campus was demolished and all learning was diverted to the two decant campuses located in the Sha Tin area.

The two decant campuses, Sha Tin Wai and Tai Wai, housed two different sets of levels. Sha Tin Wai housed Years 7, 8, 12 and 13, while Tai Wai housed Years 9, 10 and 11.

In August 2022, Island School returned back to Borrett Road. The newly built campus includes a performing arts centre, an indoor swimming pool, a sports hall, basketball courts, sky gardens, a black box theatre, and creative studios. As well as a range of other facilities there will be designated parking for school buses under the school buildings to facilitate pick-up and drop-off, thus relieving traffic pressure from Borrett Road itself.

Academics

Middle Phase: Year 7-8 (previously  Junior Phase) 
‘Island Learning’ is unique to Island School, encouraging students to make connections between their subjects and the real world. The Island Learning units are at the heart of the curriculum. Island Learning has been accredited by the IB organisation as part of their MYP programme.

Middle Phase: Year 9-11 
Island Futures provides a rounded education with a compulsory core, complemented by a wide range of student choice in subjects and courses. These choices are made after discussion and guidance with House staff and teachers, and through consultation with parents. Students are advised of the impact that any choice may have on their future at school and beyond. It is divided into four different areas: Entrance, Elements, Explorations and Escape.

Senior Phase: Year 12-13 
In their Senior Years, students will choose whether to study the IBCP (Careers Programme) or the IBDP (Diploma Programme).

Island School offers the International Baccalaureate (IB) Career Programme. The IBCP offers students who want to focus their education on preparing for their career a specialist pathway. Students on the globally expanding IBCP choose a mixture of IB Diploma Courses and BTEC subjects. The 3 BTEC Courses they choose are as ‘applied’ as possible, this means that when studying the Business course they will be running a business and the TV and Film course sees students doing a lot of filming and editing. They are vocational and are only recognised globally as university entrance but Island School has an exceptional record of placing students from this pathway.

The International Baccalaureate (IB) Diploma Programme is an academically challenging and balanced curriculum that prepares students for success at university and beyond. It has been designed to address the intellectual, social, emotional and physical well-being of students. The programme has gained extensive recognition and respect from the world’s leading universities.Students have to choose six subjects for the full IB Diploma. This must include at least one from each Group 1-5. Students then opt to take up a Group 6 Subject or choose an additional elective subject from Group 1-5. Students must choose 3 subjects at Higher Level and 3 at Standard Level.All IB Diploma students have to complete the IB Core. This includes the Extended Essay, Theory of Knowledge and CAS (Creativity, Activity and Service).

Examinations 
In Island School, students take a selection of IGCSE, GCSE, IBDP or IBCP examinations.

In 2021, the school attained excellent results.

For IGCSE/GCSE, 68% of students achieving an A*-A  grades. 96% of all grades were A*-C. Three students achieved the top grade in all of their subjects.

For IB, 100% of students passed and the cohort achieved the school’s highest ever average Diploma score of 38.3 points, five points above the world average. Seven DP students achieved the maximum 45 points, with 12 securing 44 points and another 11 securing 43 points. Almost 45% of the cohort achieved 40 points or more – another truly remarkable result. This year, ten students successfully completed the IB Careers Programme. Each student studies two IB diploma subjects, their average score was 6.5 points. They also completed 3 BTEC subjects and this year all of our students achieved either Distinction star or Distinction across all subjects. In addition they also had to submit to the IB an academic research paper, the ‘Reflective Project’ and scored on average an excellent grade B.

Notable alumni and staff

Alumni
 Alexandra, Countess of Frederiksborg
 Jay Haddow, professional footballer for Blackburn Rovers
 Mark Chapman, New Zealand and Hong Kong cricketer
 Richard Juan, actor, TV host and entrepreneur
 Christine Loh, former Hong Kong Legislative Councillor, founder and CEO of Civic Exchange and founder of Hong Kong Human Rights Monitor. 
 Harry Hill, comedian, author and TV presenter, attended for two years from age 14
 Annemarie Munk, HK Olympic swimmer
 Alice Patten, actress and daughter of Chris Patten, the former Hong Kong governor
 Fiona Sit (Singer and actress)
 Dominic Lau (Radio DJ)
 Mia Kang (fashion model, Muay Thai fighter and television host)
Hannah Wilson, HK Olympic swimmer.
 Melanie Wilson, GB Olympic rower, silver medal at 2016 Olympics
 Neelam Kothari, Indian actress
 Nina Wadia, British actress and comedian. Awarded an Officer of the Order of the British Empire (OBE) in the 2021 New Year Honours for services to entertainment and charity.
 Vivien Tan, former model, 1-time actress in British-Australian TV series The Other Side of Paradise, former Channel [V]  VJ, and present TV host, chef and entrepreneur
 Brian Wong, Rhodes Scholar, political philosopher and writer

Staff
Jonty Driver (principal, 1978–83), who wrote a book about his experiences at the school

See also
 Education in Hong Kong

References

External links

 

 
Educational institutions established in 1967
1967 establishments in Hong Kong